|}

The Prix du Bois is a Group 3 flat horse race in France open to two-year-old thoroughbreds. It is run at Deauville over a distance of 1,000 metres (about 5 furlongs), and it is scheduled to take place each year in late June or early July.

History
The event was established in 1925, and it was originally held at Longchamp. It takes its name from the Bois de Boulogne, the location of its former home, and the Avenue du Bois (now the Avenue Foch), which leads towards the racecourse.

Due to World War II, the Prix du Bois was not run from 1940 to 1945.

The race was promoted to Group 3 status in 1982. It continued to be staged at Longchamp until 1994. It took place at Chantilly in 1995, and returned to Longchamp in 1996. For a period thereafter it was switched between Deauville (1997–98, 2003) and Chantilly (1999–2002, 2004–05).

The Prix du Bois was transferred to Maisons-Laffitte in 2006, and  had another spell at Chantilly between 2009 and 2015. It has been run at Deauville again since 2016.

The leading horses from the Prix du Bois often go on to compete in the Prix Robert Papin. The first to win both races was Erica in 1927, and the most recent was Family One in 2011.

Records
Leading jockey (10 wins):
 Roger Poincelet – Chesterfield (1946), Arbace (1948), Dahabi (1949), Lets Fly (1953), Polamia (1957), Dan Cupid (1958), High Bulk (1960), Mr Brookwood (1961), Spy Well (1962), Timmy Lad (1963)

Leading trainer (6 wins):
 François Mathet – Taoutcha (1952), Calshot (1966), Zeddaan (1967), Rockcress (1968), Myosotis (1974), Adraan (1979)
 Etienne Pollet – Polamia (1957), Dan Cupid (1958), High Bulk (1960), Mr Brookwood (1961), Spy Well (1962), Timmy Lad (1963)
 Pascal Bary – Export Price (1986), Rich and Famous (1989), Imperfect World (1998), Much Faster (2003), Divine Proportions (2004), Natagora (2007)

Leading owner (5 wins):
 Gertrude Widener – Polamia (1957), Dan Cupid (1958), Mr Brookwood (1961), Spy Well (1962), Timmy Lad (1963)

Winners since 1978

 The 2020 race was run at Longchamp due to the COVID-19 pandemic in France
 The 2021 and 2022 race was run at Chantilly and the distance was 1,200 meters

Earlier winners

 1925: Tatters
 1926: Never Late
 1927: Erica
 1928: La Rocque
 1929: Advertencia
 1930: Cristal
 1931: Sisterari
 1932: Asterisk
 1933: Corindon
 1934: Puits d'Amour
 1935: Don Milo
 1936: Le Radjah
 1937: Pamir
 1938: Courteille
 1939: Folincourt
 1940–45: no race
 1946: Chesterfield
 1947: Primeur
 1948: Arbace
 1949: Dahabi
 1950: Idas
 1951: Pharaos
 1952: Taoutcha
 1953: Let's Fly
 1954: Americ
 1955: Reine Martiale
 1956: L'Astrologue
 1957: Polamia
 1958: Dan Cupid
 1959: Barbaresque
 1960: High Bulk
 1961: Mr Brookwood
 1962: Spy Well
 1963: Timmy Lad
 1964: Fair Portion
 1965: Nursery Song
 1966: Calshot
 1967: Zeddaan
 1968: Rockcress
 1969: Baroque
 1970: My Swallow
 1971: Daring Display
 1972: Benthose
 1973: Lianga
 1974: Myosotis
 1975: Dacani
 1976: Juge de Paix
 1977: Soudromont

See also
 List of French flat horse races

References

 France Galop / Racing Post:
 france-galop.com – A Brief History: Prix du Bois.
 galop.courses-france.com – Prix du Bois – Palmarès depuis 1980.
 galopp-sieger.de – Prix du Bois.
 horseracingintfed.com – International Federation of Horseracing Authorities – Prix du Bois (2017).
 pedigreequery.com – Prix du Bois – Chantilly.

Flat horse races for two-year-olds
Chantilly Racecourse
Horse races in France
Recurring sporting events established in 1925
1925 establishments in France